Beer in Israel is manufactured primarily by two major breweries – Tempo Beer Industries and Israel Beer Breweries. Over the past decade numerous microbreweries have established themselves throughout the country. Beer festivals are held annually in Israel, of which one of the largest is in Jerusalem.

History
Like the Phoenicians, the Greeks and the Romans, the ancient Israelites were far more drawn to wine than they were to beer. After the exile of the Jews to Babylonia in the sixth century BC, they began embracing beer and several rabbis became established brewers. Two notable Babylonian Jewish brewers were Rav Chisda and his pupil Rav Papa, both of whom lived in the vicinity of Sura during the fourth century CE.

In  James Armand de Rothschild, identifying a demand for beer on the part of British nationals residing in Palestine, established the first local commercial brewery in partnership with Gaston Dreyfus, in Rishon LeZion. In 1940 the Palestine Brewery – or, as it was also known, the Nesher Brewery – was commissioned by the AACI to supply beer to Australian troops stationed in Palestine. By 1942 the brewery was compelled to enlarge its plant in order to meet increased demand being generated on the part of both military and civilian consumers.

Construction of what was at the time the largest brewery in the Middle East, the National Brewery, began in April 1952 in the city of Netanya, founded by a group of investors led by Louis Herzberg. Upon completion in May 1953, the National Brewery had an annual production capacity of 400,000 barrels. In 1954 it shipped what was theretofore "[t]he largest single shipment of imported beer ever to enter the United States" – 180,000 bottles of its Abir label beer. The National Brewery merged with the Palestine Brewery and the Galilee Brewery in 1973, whereby it came to control 90% of Israel's beer market. In 1980 a canned beer bearing a label indicating its origin as the National Brewery in Netanya was being sold in Egypt in spite of an Egyptian boycott of Israeli products. Called O.K. beer, it proved more successful than Heineken and Tuborg and was consumed at premier bars in Cairo and other locations in Egypt, even as conservative religious Muslim leaders campaigned to ban the sale of alcoholic drinks in the country. After entering into a license agreement with Anheuser-Busch International in 1983 for production of the first American beer in Israel, the National Brewery began producing Budweiser in 1984.

The National Brewery was acquired by Tempo Beer Industries in 1985.

Breweries
Since the 1950s, the Israeli beer industry has been dominated by no more than two companies at a time. Beginning in the 1990s with the establishment of Israel Beer Breweries, it and Tempo Beer Industries control 70% of Israel's beer market. Tempo produces the Goldstar and Maccabee labels, while Israel Beer produces Carlsberg and Tuborg. In addition, around two dozen licensed commercial microbreweries operate in the country.

Netanya-based Tempo is the largest brewery in Israel. In 1999 Tempo's Goldstar and Maccabee beers accounted for 60% of all beer sales in the country. Tempo also imports Heineken and Amstel. In 1996 it began distributing Guinness. Israel Beer Breweries operates a beer-themed visitor center in Ashkelon.

Craft beer

Craft brewing began to develop midway through the first decade of the 2000s. The Dancing Camel Brewery, which opened in Tel Aviv in 2006, was the first microbrewery to open in Israel. Later that year the Golan Brewery opened up in the Golan Heights region of Israel. Jem's Beer Factory, Israel's first kosher microbrewery, opened in Petah Tiqwa in 2009. By the end of 2009 there were microbreweries operating from Dekel and Qiryat Gat in Israel's south; through Sal'it, Petah Tiqwa and Tel Aviv; up to Haifa, the Jezreel Valley, Ramot Naftali, and Yehi'am; and as far as Qatzrin in the Golan Heights. 2010 was an especially active year for new microbreweries.

Beers

The first native beer label to emerge in what would soon become the State of Israel was Nesher, in the 1930s. Two varieties of Nesher were available at that time – a pilsner lager and a malt beer. Nesher Malt continues to be known in Hebrew as bira shechora ("black beer").

Goldstar, a pale lager brewed in Israel since 1950, was originally produced at the Cabeer Brewery in Rishon LeZion. In the years between 1952 and the mid-1980s a popular beer brewed in Israel was Abir. Maccabee, a pilsner invented by brewmaster Menachem Berliner, was introduced in 1968 and competed with Goldstar for market share until the 1970s. Goldstar and Maccabee were acquired in 1975 by a single partnership and were sold to Tempo in 1986. Goldstar won a Monde Selection gold medal in 2007, and in 2011 it won an Israeli Product of the Year award.

The brews produced by the Dancing Camel microbrewery are adapted to accommodate Israel's palate which, according to founder David Cohen, eschews bitter flavors. Thus the Dancing Camel IPA offsets the bitterness of its hops with silan, a syrup extracted from dates. Dancing Camel also produces seasonal beers inspired by the Jewish holidays: for Rosh Hashanah Dancing Camel releases a pomegranate beer, and for Sukkoth a wheat beer made with etrog.

Culture

Bars
The first Irish pub in Israel was Molly Bloom's, which opened in central Tel Aviv in 2000 as a partnership between Israel Beer Breweries and an Irish entrepreneur. By 2004 there were Irish pubs in Tel Aviv, Herzliya, Rehovoth, and Glilot. Porter and Sons in Tel Aviv, which opened in 2010, has the most beers on tap of any establishment in Israel – 50 as of 2012. In the category of Best Beer Restaurant in Israel, Beers.co.il awarded Porter and Sons first place in 2012.
In June 2012 a new bar was opened next to Shuk HaCarmel called Beer Bazaar. They serve over 80 Israeli beers, more than 10 Israeli ciders and also have their own beer on tap.

Festivals
The Jerusalem Beer Festival is one of the largest beer festivals in Israel, held annually in the summer since 2004. The festival is held for two days usually between August 28–29. Other festivals are held in Tel Aviv, Haifa and the Mateh Yehuda region. A wine and beer festival is held annually in Beer Sheva. The city of Ashdod held its first beer festival in 2011.

Israeli Beer Club
In 2002 the Israeli Beer Club was established in order to promote the culture of beer in Israel and specifically to serve as a platform for helping small-scale brewers and importers to get their products onto the market. The club offers homebrewing and beer tasting workshops and is involved in organizing beer competitions.

Economy

In the late 1990s beer sales in Israel totaled , of which Tempo accounted for 73%. The malt beverage industry generated a separate  in sales. Between 1992 and 1997 the share of international labels in the market grew from 9% to 36%, with a concomitant decline in the share of domestic labels over the same period from 91% to 64%. Its size in 2010 was estimated at 950,000–1,000,000 hectoliters, up from 800,000 in 2005.

With a strong local economy the alcoholic drinks market in general is growing within Israel, with particular growth in beer sales. The leading beer companies, such as Tempo Beer Industries and Israel Beer Breweries, launched new beer brands in 2007, with the most significant introductions being Goldstar Light, Tuborg T and Samuel Adams. Goldstar and Maccabee are the overall leading brands in Israel. Over 75% of beer sales in Israel are from off-sales locations such as supermarkets, rather than bars.

In 2012 Israel's finance minister signed an order to raise the purchase tax on beer from NIS2.18 to NIS4.19 per liter. The move was opposed by Eli Yishai of the Shas party, who said it would have fatal repercussions vis-a-vis Israel's local boutique breweries.

Kashrut
According to Ludwig Horlein of the Hartmannsdorf Brewery in Germany, with respect to ingredients there is no difference between kosher and non-kosher beer. In general, observant Jews will only drink unflavored beers without a kosher certification (compared to flavored beers, which do require a kosher certification). But according to Israeli beer expert Gad Deviri, kosher certification is not a consideration for many observant Jews in Israel. However, while unflavored beers with no additives are acceptable even without Kosher certification, some beers may contain additives that are not kosher. It is also generally accepted that, as a beverage made with grains such as barley, beer is considered chametz and never kosher for Passover.

See also

 Beer and breweries by region
 Beer in Palestine

References

Further reading

 
Israeli alcoholic drinks